L.U.C.A.: The Beginning (Hangul: 루카: 더 비기닝; RR: Ruka: Deo Bigining) is a South Korean television series starring Kim Rae-won and Lee Da-hee. It aired on tvN from February 1 to March 9, 2021.

Synopsis
Zi O (Kim Rae-won) has a special power and a secret, but he doesn't know who he really is. He is chased by mysterious figures, while he tries to find answers to numerous questions that surround him.

Ha Neul-ae-goo-reum (Lee Da-hee) is a detective. When she decides on a course of action, she won't change no matter what. Her parents disappeared when she was only a young child. Goo-reum chases after the truth behind her parents' disappearance. She meets Zi O and her life changes.

Cast

Main
 Kim Rae-won as Zi O
 Oh Han-kyul as young Zi O
 A man who has a secret power and is wanted by Human Tech. He doesn't remember anything after waking up from a major happening. He decides to find out who he really is after being chased by unknown people, while understanding that he is not a normal person.
 Lee Da-hee as Ha Neul-ae-goo-reum
 Seo Eun-sol as young Ha Neul-ae-goo-reum
 A detective in the Violent Crimes unit 1st team in Juan Metropolitan Police Station. She was originally from the Major Crimes unit, but was demoted. Her parents went missing when she was a kid, and for nine years she never stops finding them.
 Kim Sung-oh as Lee Son
 A former Special Forces soldier. He was sentenced to life imprisonment for having accidentally killed 9 people during a tactical training, when he threw a grenade instead of a flare. He was offered by Cheol-soo to work for him, and lead a chasing team to capture Zi O. He had lost his entire right arm in a past attempt to capture Zi O, and Human Tech had to install an artificial one for him.

Supporting

L.U.C.A. Project
 Park Hyuk-kwon as Kim Cheol-soo
 A secret influential figure from the National Intelligence Service. He supports Joong-kwon and the project in order to get very rich if it succeeds, and will do anything in order to make the project successful.
 Ahn Nae-sang as Ryu Joong-kwon
 The director of Human Tech, and is the scientist who oversaw the only success in the project. In the past, he was forced out of the academia for defying the research ethics of "artificial human enhancement". He was subsequently imprisoned for embezzlement of research funds. After that, Cheol-soo supported him in order for the latter to create the most perfect human being.
 Jin Kyung as Hwang Jung-ah
 The founder of Human Tech. She is the leader of a cult, but believes in scientific theories rather than the words of God. She is well-connected and rich, but doesn't know what she can use them for, until she found her target in creating new lives.

Juan Metropolitan Police Station
 Kim Sang-ho as Choi Jin-hwan
 Team leader of the Violent Crimes unit 1st team. He ranks last in the police station for conviction rate, as he was always given the most difficult cases to handle. He detests Goo-reum at first when she joined his team, but he takes care of her like family.
 Hwang Jae-yeol as Kim Yoo-chul
 A detective of the Violent Crimes unit 1st team. He believes in Jin-hwan more than anyone else, and takes care of his juniors delicately. He was worried about Goo-reum being persistent in investigating the case surrounding Ji Oh, but he is willing to help her till the end.
 Han Kyu-wan as Kim Jin-soo
 A detective of the Violent Crimes unit 1st team.

Chasing Team
 Jung Da-eun as Choi Yoo-na
 Part of Lee Son's chasing team to capture Ji Oh. She was sentenced to life imprisonment for having accidentally killed 5 people during a tactical training, when she fired real bullets instead of blanks, and lost her right foot in the same accident. She was offered by Cheol-soo to work for him under Lee Son.
 Kim Min-gwi as Kim Tae-oh
 Part of Lee Son's chasing team to capture Ji Oh. An extremely loyal person who executes missions without question.
 Lee Joong-ok as Kim Hwang-sik
 Part of Lee Son's chasing team to capture Ji Oh. He is a network technician who was discharged due to corruption.

Others
 Lee Hae-young as Oh Jong-hwan
 A professor working under the National Forensic Service. He was close friends with Joong-kwon in college days, but after the latter crossed the line that scientists should not cross, he led people to force Joong-kwon out of the academia.
 Ahn Chang-hwan as Won-yi
 Zi O's friend. He was the only person who knew about Zi O's power, and in the past he used it for mischief.
 Lee Yong-nyeo as Sister Stella
 Kim Hyung-min as Ha Young-jae
 Goo-reum's father who is currently missing. The co-founder of Human Tech, and was the co-researcher for the L.U.C.A. Project.

Special appearances
 Lee Won-jong as Kim Man-sik
 Zi O's colleague in Dagyeong Resources. (Ep. 1)
 Jung Eun-chae as Director Jung
 The chief inspector of National Intelligence Service's inspection team, working with Jung-ah under the pretext of antibodies. (Ep. 8-12)
 Lee Min-young as Cameo (Ep. 12)

Original soundtrack

Part 1

Part 2

Part 3

Part 4

Viewership

References

External links
  
 
 
 

TVN (South Korean TV channel) television dramas
2021 South Korean television series debuts
2021 South Korean television series endings
South Korean crime television series
South Korean science fiction television series
South Korean mystery television series